Greatest Hits – Volume I & Volume II is the first greatest hits album by American Billy Joel. The album has been certified double diamond by the RIAA, selling over 11.5 million copies (23 million units) and is tied with Pink Floyd's The Wall for sixth most certified album of all time in the US.

The album includes hits from 1973 to 1985 in chronological order with one exception. 
Some foreign pressings include "Honesty" in place of "Don't Ask Me Why".
The compilation includes two previously unreleased tracks, "You're Only Human (Second Wind)" and "The Night Is Still Young". These two songs were also available as singles and, in 1989, on the 5-disc box set Souvenir: The Ultimate Collection which included the entire Greatest Hits Volume I & Volume II. "You're Only Human (Second Wind)" later featured on the compilation The Ultimate Collection released in 2000, and on disc 15, Collected Additional Masters, of The Complete Albums Collection box set, released in 2011. "The Night Is Still Young" was also included on that same disc 15. 
Contrary to some sources, the sax solo on "New York State of Mind" was never re-recorded by Phil Woods for the release of Greatest Hits. The only time that Phil Woods performed on a Billy Joel recording was the song "Just the Way You Are" in 1977.

Track listing
All tracks are written by Billy Joel.

Double LP/Double cassette

Some original pressings omit "Don't Ask Me Why" and place "Honesty" after "Big Shot", pushing "You May Be Right" to the beginning of Side three.

Double CD release

2017 release

There are three versions of the CD available. The initial 1985 release has "Honesty" as the third track on disc 2, second pressings onward had "Don't Ask Me Why" as the third track, and the 1998 remaster has "Don't Ask Me Why" as the fifth track on disc 2. However, the disc with "Honesty" does not have "Don't Ask Me Why" and vice versa.

On the original 1985 releases, five songs are shorter than their original versions: "Just the Way You Are" is only 3:34 long (1½ minute shorter), verse 2 is totally omitted (from "Don't go trying some new fashion" to "I want you just the way you are") and the sax solo at the end fades early; "My Life" is 3:50 long (nearly 1 minute shorter), the intro is slightly shorter with piano notes at 0:25 omitted (before the first words), same notes are omitted between verses 1 and 2, then again after "You wake up with yourself", piano passage also missing after "But not on my time" and the piano notes omitted several times at the end; "Big Shot" is 3:43 long (the ending with the "big shot… wow" is shortened by ½ minute approx.); "Pressure" is only 3:13 long (1½ min shorter) with more than a verse omitted (from "I'll tell you what it means" to "I read it too, what does it mean?"); "Tell Her About It" is 3:33 long (the end fades approx. 20 seconds sooner, leaving some wording out).

In 1998, the two CD set was digitally remastered and packaged with two bonus videos ("You're Only Human (Second Wind)" and "The Night Is Still Young") on disc 1. All of the songs that were edited in the 1985 package ("Pressure", "My Life", "Big Shot", "Just the Way You Are" and "Tell Her About It") were restored to their original album lengths. Also, the live version of "Say Goodbye to Hollywood" was removed and replaced with the studio version from Joel's 1976 album Turnstiles. Surprisingly, "Captain Jack" has been shortened instead, fading out about 20 seconds sooner (6:56 instead of 7:15).

Charts

Weekly charts

Year-end charts

Certifications and sales

References

Billy Joel compilation albums
1985 greatest hits albums
Albums produced by Phil Ramone
Columbia Records compilation albums